Doi Nang Non ('Mountain of the Sleeping Lady') is a mountain range in the Thai highlands in Chiang Rai Province, Thailand. It is a karstic formation with numerous waterfalls and caves rising at the southern end of the Daen Lao Range. Part of its area is managed as the Tham Luang–Khun Nam Nang Non Forest Park.

Geography
Doi Nang Non consists of a long hill tract that lies on the west side of the highway between Chiang Rai and Mae Sai. The greater part of the range is in Mae Sai District, extending west and southwest of Pong Pha along the border with Myanmar. The mountain range is an unusual land feature when seen from certain angles as its silhouette takes the shape of a reclining woman with long hair. Its highest point is Doi Tung, which corresponds to the belly of the lady.

Caves
There are a number of caves and underground water courses in the range area.

Tham Luang Nang Non ('Great Cave of the Sleeping Lady') is a semi-dry limestone cave in the Doi Nang Non range. There are numerous stalactites and stalagmites in some parts of the system. In 2018, Tham Luang was the site of a rescue operation to find and evacuate a local junior football team trapped inside. The cave was damaged during the operation. Authorities plan to rehabilitate the cave and its surrounding landscape, and have discussed plans of turning the area into a national park due to the increased tourist interest in it.
Khun Nam Nang Non ('Headwaters of the Sleeping Lady') is a natural pond into which water flows from the rocks above. This water is said to be the tears of the legendary lady's ghost.

History
In 1986 an eight km2 sector of the range which included the entrance to the main cave was declared the Tham Luang–Khun Nam Nang Non Forest Park.

2018 rescue operation

On 23 June 2018, a group of twelve boys aged between 11 and 16, who went to explore Tham Luang Nang Non with their assistant football coach, aged 25, went missing. The group was found 10 days later. They were part of a local junior football team. The cave they entered became flooded. Thai Navy SEAL divers had been searching the caves ever since. Owing to heavy rain which further flooded the cave entrance, searches were periodically interrupted. Thai NAVY divers soon got help from American, Australian, British, and Chinese divers, military members, and emergency personnel.

The group was found alive on Monday evening, 2 July, according to a press release at 22:30. All 12 boys along with their coach were reported alive. They were found by British volunteer divers around 400 metres away from a spot nicknamed "Pattaya Beach", an elevated mound in the cave. Food and medical supplies were delivered but a three-hour-long journey, continued rains and mountainous terrain above the cave delayed their escape. On 8 July at 19:00 four of the boys had been rescued. By 10 July at 19:00, all of the boys and their coach had been rescued from the cave.

Legend
One of the legends goes that in ancient times a beautiful princess fell in love with a stable boy and became pregnant. Knowing their love was forbidden, they fled and went in the cave to rest. When the boy went in search of food, he was caught by the princess' father's army and killed. The distraught princess stabbed herself to death and the legend says her blood became the water that flows through the cave, while her body is the surrounding mountains, said to look like a sleeping woman.

Tourism
Some of the caves in the hill area have been developed as a tourist attraction. There is a viewpoint at Mae Chan District, from where the "sleeping lady" can best be observed. Local tour guides joke that Doi Nang Non would be "the highest mountain in the world", if only the supposed lady would get up and stand on her feet.

See also
Doi Tung
Tham Luang cave rescue
List of mountains in Thailand
 List of caves
 Speleology

Notes

References

External links
Why cave search is so tricky, Bangkok Post
The Sleeping Lady Legend (waybacked)
Chiang Rai Tourism 
Two of the Doi Nang Non legends  

Daen Lao Range
Geography of Chiang Rai province
Mountains of Thailand
Thai folklore
Tham Luang cave rescue